Ferhat Göçer (born 11 May 1970) is a Turkish pop singer, songwriter and physician.

Born to a family with Kurdish origin as the eldest son of his parents, Göçer was born in Birecik and raised in İzmit. At his parents' request, he started his education at the age of 4.
In 1985 he graduated from İzmit High School. He later won a scholarship for Istanbul Faculty of Medicine and in 1988 got enrolled in Istanbul University State Conservatory Singing Department after which he worked as a contractor for State Opera and Ballet.

From November 2012 to May 2014, he was a UNICEF goodwill ambassador for Turkey. In 2017, he retired after 25 years of working as a physician.

Discography

Studio albums

Compilation albums

EPs

Singles

Split albums

Charts

References 

Living people
1970 births
Turkish pop singers
20th-century Turkish physicians
Istanbul University Faculty of Medicine alumni
Turkish people of Kurdish descent
21st-century Turkish male singers
21st-century Turkish physicians